Dimitrios Grammozis (born 8 July 1978) is a Greek-German professional football manager and former player who last coached Schalke 04. During his playing years, he was known as a versatile defender and defensive midfielder.

Playing career

Early years
Grammozis was born in Wuppertal and grew up in Velbert. He began his football career in 1984 with local side TuS Neviges in the Velbert neighborhood district. After four years, in 1988, Grammozis moved to SSVg Velbert, where he played for three years. His next and final stop in Velbert was a two-year stint at Borussia Velbert. In 1992, Grammozis returned to his hometown. After a year in the youth teams of Wuppertaler SV, he moved in 1994 to KFC Uerdingen 05, where he played two more years in the A-youth. In 1996, aged 18, Grammozis played his first senior season in the 2. Bundesliga with KFC Uerdingen. In 1998, after another season in the 2. Bundesliga, he was transferred to Bundesliga side Hamburger SV for €350,000.

Senior career
Grammozis spent two years with Hamburger SV, contributing to a third-place 1999–2000 Bundesliga finish and subsequent qualification to the Champions League. However, he did not manage to permanently assert himself as a regular, and in addition to the arrival of quality players, Grammozis moved to 1. FC Kaiserslautern in 2000. He spent five years with The Red Devils, characterized by injury problems and difficulties with his coaches, especially in his last two seasons.

At the start of the season 2005–06 season, Grammozis moved to newly promoted side 1. FC Köln on a two-year deal. However, after the end of the season, the club prematurely terminated Grammozis' contract. As a result, on 20 July 2006 he moved on a free transfer to 2. Bundesliga newly promoted side Rot-Weiss Essen, signing a contract until 30 June 2008.

In June 2007 Grammozis left Germany and moved to Super League Greece side Ergotelis, signing a one-year contract with an option for another year. After a successful 2007–08 season with Ergotelis in which he played in 23 games and scored once, the club opted to extend his contract. However, after falling out with coach Nikos Karageorgiou in November 2008, Grammozis was transferred out to Cypriot First Division side Omonia Nicosia in December for a reported €150,000. He spent 2.5 years at Omonia, where he became Cypriot champion in 2010, and won the Cypriot Super Cup against Apollon Limassol.

In January 2011, Grammozis returned to the Super League Greece and joined newly promoted side AO Kerkyra. In the summer of 2012, he moved to VfL Bochum II, signing for two years, but ended up retiring his career at the end of the 2012–13 Regionalliga, having played in 26 games.

Coaching career
On 25 January 2014, Grammozis was hired as assistant to head coach Thomas Reis for VfL Bochum II. At the start of the 2014–15 season, he took over the U-15 juniors of VfL Bochum in the Regionalliga West, his first youth team as coach.

In March 2018, Grammozis successfully received his coaching license by the German Football Association.

On 24 February 2019, he was appointed as the head coach of Darmstadt 98 until the end of the 2019–20 season.

On 2 March 2021, he was appointed as the fifth head coach of Schalke 04 during the 2020–21 Bundesliga season. He received a contract until 2022. On 6 March 2022, he was relieved from his duties.

Personal life
Grammozis parents hail from Kefalovryso, Ioannina.

Career statistics

Club

Managerial

References

External links

Living people
1978 births
Association football midfielders
Greek footballers
Greek expatriate footballers
Greece under-21 international footballers
KFC Uerdingen 05 players
Hamburger SV players
1. FC Kaiserslautern players
1. FC Köln players
Rot-Weiss Essen players
Ergotelis F.C. players
AC Omonia players
A.O. Kerkyra players
VfL Bochum II players
German people of Greek descent
Expatriate footballers in Cyprus
Expatriate footballers in Greece
Bundesliga players
2. Bundesliga players
Super League Greece players
Cypriot First Division players
Greek football managers
Bundesliga managers
2. Bundesliga managers
SV Darmstadt 98 managers
FC Schalke 04 managers
Sportspeople from Wuppertal